Olixon banksii is a species of rhopalosomatid wasp in the family Rhopalosomatidae. It occurs in North America.

References

Rhopalosomatidae
Hymenoptera of North America
Parasitic wasps
Taxa named by Charles Thomas Brues
Insects described in 1922
Articles created by Qbugbot